Bose Krishnamachari is an Indian painter and artist-curator based in Mumbai, India. He was born in 1963 at Mangattukara village near Angamaly, Kerala. He had done his early schooling at Government Higher Secondary School, Puliyanam. He took his BFA from Sir J. J. School of Art, Mumbai in 1991, and then completed his MFA from Goldsmiths' College, University of London in 2000.

Bose was a recipient of the award of the Kerala Lalithakala Akademi (1985), British Council Travel Award (1993), Mid-America Arts Alliance Award (1996), Charles Wallace India Trust Award (1999–2000), Life Time Fellowship Award- Kerala Lalithakala Akademi and was first runner up for the Bose Pacia Prize for Modern Art, New York, 2001. His work comprises vivid abstract paintings, figurative drawings, sculpture, photography, multimedia installations and architecture. Since 1985, he lives and works in Mumbai. Bose is the founder member and President of Kochi Biennale Foundation and Biennale Director of international exhibition of contemporary art, Kochi-Muziris Biennale.

Exhibitions
His paintings have been exhibited in numerous solo and group exhibitions internationally. He also actively curates exhibitions and projects of fellow artists around India.

Select solo exhibitions

2010 No, 1 × 1 Contemporary, Dubai
2009–10 LaVA, (Laboratory of Visual Arts), a Traveling Installation Project at Gallery BMB, Mumbai
2008–09 To Let – White Ghost, Kashi Art Cafe, Kochi
2008 Ghost, Aicon Gallery, London
Bodhi Art, Mumbai
2007 LaVA [Laboratory of Visual Arts, a travelling installation project], 
Mumbai, Bangalore, Kolkata, Kochi, Baroda and New Delhi
2006 Ghost/Transmemoir (preview at Kitab Mahal, Mumbai), Aicon Gallery, New York
2005 Exist, Jehangir Art Gallery, Mumbai
2004 Vanitas Vanitatum, Kashi Art Gallery, Kochi, later joined a group show in Mumbai
2003 De-Curating Indian Contemporary Artists, Sakshi Art Gallery, Mumbai, Sumukha, Bangalore and Durbar Hall, Kochi
1999 AmUseuM Memoirs, NGMA, Mumbai
Field Sakshi, Sakshi Gallery, Mumbai
1996 Dandy, Lakeeren and YB Chavan Centre, Mumbai
1995 Objects of Attention, inaugural show, Academy of Fine Arts and Literature, New Delhi 
1993 AmUseuM, Park Sheraton, Chennai
1992 AmUseuM, Jehangir Art Gallery, Mumbai, Sakshi Gallery, Bangalore
1991 Music of the Cubes, British Council Gallery
1990 Sir JJ School of Art, Mumbai
1989 Kerala Kalapeethom, Kochi

Curated shows

2008 Af-fair, 1X1 Contemporary and 1X1 Gallery, Dubai
2007 Soft Spoken, NCPA, (organised by Bombay Art Gallery), Mumbai
Spy, Museum Art Gallery, (organised by The Guild Art Gallery), Mumbai
Everyone is a Camera, Talvin Singh, Bombay Art Gallery, Mumbai
2006 MaaRKERS, Bodhi Art Gallery, Mumbai
2005 Double-Enders, 
(curated) Jehangir Art Gallery and The Museum Gallery, Mumbai; Vadhera Art Gallery, New Delhi; Gallery Sumukha, Bangalore; Durbar Hall, Kochi)

2004 Bombay X 17, (curated) Kashi Art Gallery, Kochi

Bombay Boys, (curated) Palette Art Gallery, New Delhi

Select group exhibitions

2011 Census of Sense, Exhibit 320, New Delhi
Love is a 4 Letter Word, Latitude 28, New Delhi
Gallery Sumukha, Chennai
Against All Odds: A Contemporary Response to the Historiography of Archiving Collecting, and Museums in India, Lalit Kala Akademi, New Delhi
2010 Looking Glass: The Existence of Difference, Twenty Indian Contemporary Artists presented by Religare Arts Initiative, New Delhi in collaboration with American Centre; British Council; Goethe-Institut/ Max Mueller Bhavan, New Delhi
A. SYCO, The Viewing Room, Mumbai
Beyond Object hood, presented by Gandhara Art Gallery at Nandalal Bose Hall, Indian Council for Cultural Relations (ICCR), Kolkata
1x1 Art Gallery, Dubai 
2009 Vistaar II, presented by Seven Arts Limited at The Stainless Gallery, New Delhi
In the Mood for Paper, F2 Gallery, Beijing
Threshold: Forging Narratives in South Asian Contemporary Art, Aicon Gallery, New York
Signs Taken for Wonders: Recent Art from India and Pakistan, Aicon Gallery, London
Mutant Beauty, Anant Art Gallery, New Delhi
2008 November, 1x1 Contemporary, Al Quoz, Dubai
Anant Art Gallery, New Delhi
Everywhere is War, curated by Shaheen Merali at Bodhi Art Gallery, Mumbai
Pastiche – exhibition of paintings, Chaithanya Art Gallery, Kochi
2007 INDIA OGGI ARTE, Provincia Di Milano, Spazio Oberdan, Milano, Viale Vittorio Veneto
India! Gallerie Helene Lamarque, Paris
Summation, Gallery Beyond, Mumbai
Strangeness, Anant Art Gallery, Kolkatta
India 20, Lalit Kala Akademy, New Delhi
Masters curated by Lathamy, Dubai
2006 The Shape that Is, Jendela and Concourse, Esplanade, Singapore, organised with Bodhi Art
2006–08 Harmony Show, Mumbai
2005–06 KAAM, Aicon Gallery, New York and Palo Alto
2005 We Are Like This One, Rabindra Bhavan, organised by Vadehra Art Gallery
Paths of Progression, Mumbai, New York, Singapore and New Delhi; organised by Bodhi Art and Saffron Art
2004 Vanitas Vanitatum, curated by Peter Nagy, Sakshi Gallery, Mumbai
Anticipations, Jehangir Art Gallery and The Museum Gallery, Mumbai
2003 Ideas and Images, NGMA, Bombay
Highlights, Sakshi Art Gallery, Mumbai
Remembering Bhupen... Homage to late Bhupen Khakkar, Kashi ArtCafe, Fort – Kochi
2002 Tribute to Picasso, The Guild Art Gallery, Mumbai
2001 Mutations – Rumor City, curated by Hans Ulrich Obrist, Tokyo
2000 MA Show, Goldsmiths College, London
Exile & Longings, Lakeeren Art Gallery, Mumbai
Memos of the New Millennium- from Artists of the Moulting World, curated by Abhay Sardesai, Birla Academy of Art & Culture, Mumbai
Mumbai Metaphor, Tao Art Gallery, Mumbai 
1999 Embarkations, Sakshi Art Gallery, Mumbai
1998 The Presence of the Past – an exhibition of response by Indian artists to The Enduring Images, curated by Girish Sahane, NCPA, Mumbai
1997 Persistence of Memory, curated by Peter Nagy, with Linda Benglis, Lindel Brown and Charles Green
50 Years of Art in Mumbai, NGMA, Mumbai
1996 West Wing Story, Headlands Centre for Visual Arts, Sausalito, San Francisco
1995 Recent Trends in Contemporary Indian Arts, Vadehra Art Gallery, New Delhi
Bombay – An Artist's Impression, Jehangir Art Gallery, Mumbai 
1993 Circling the Square, Jehangir Art Gallery, Mumbai
1992 Artists against Communalism, JJ School of Art & Shivaji Park, Mumbai (traveled to 15 other cities in India)
1991 Drawings, Gallery Chemould, Mumbai

Awards and honours 

2009 Guest of Honor at ARCO, Madrid, and curated the India Pavilion
2001 First runner up for the Bose Pacia Prize for Modern Art, New York
1999–2000 Charles Wallace India Trust Award
1996 Mid-America Arts Alliance Award for Travel and Residency in the United States

External links

https://web.archive.org/web/20140215104131/http://www.bosekrishnamachari.com/
saffronart "Bose Krishnamachari Profile,Interview and Artworks"
artnewsnviews.com 
aicongallery.com 
gallerysoulflower.com/
kochimuzirisbiennale 
ghsspuliyanam.org 
TED Talk by Bose krishnamachari (TEDxTKMCE)  https://www.youtube.com/watch?v=vvS64S45JpI
 https://www.hindustantimes.com/brunch/meet-the-big-boss-of-india-s-art-scene/story-btwQlxeoeMR4sp0DSqJlGO.html
 https://www.hindustantimes.com/brunch/ht-brunch-cover-story-bose-krishnamachari-creator-or-curator/story-OI2GWuDi2ca5Sk8Y8pSNyO.html
 https://www.thehindu.com/entertainment/art/bose-krishnamacharis-first-solo-in-nine-years-makes-words-play-the-role-of-images/article30761703.ece
 https://indianexpress.com/article/express-sunday-eye/artist-its-important-to-have-conversations-says-artist-bose-krishnamachari-6223263/
 https://openthemagazine.com/art-culture/bose-krishnamachari-through-a-mirror-darkly/

1963 births
Living people
Malayali people
Painters from Kerala
Artists from Mumbai
Sir Jamsetjee Jeejebhoy School of Art alumni
Kochi-Muziris Biennale
People from Angamaly
21st-century Indian painters